Point Cartwright Light is an active lighthouse located on Point Cartwright, a point near the mouth of the Mooloolah River, in Mooloolaba, Queensland, Australia. It marks the entrance to the North West Channel, a deep water channel into Moreton Bay and the Port of Brisbane, and provides guidance into the Mooloolaba Harbour.

History
Old Caloundra Light, construction in 1896, was the first to serve the purpose of marking the entrance to the North West Channel. Changes in the shipping industry in the 1960s necessitated the construction of a modern signal and radar station, and thus New Caloundra Light was erected in 1967. However, New Caloundra Light was to have a short lifespan as a coastal light. By 1978 the buildings in Caloundra had grown in height, obscuring it from some angles.

Point Cartwright Light was built in 1978. It was the sixth of a group of seven concrete towers erected by the Commonwealth between 1964 and 1979, by order of construction, Cape Capricorn Light, New Caloundra Light, Point Danger Light, New Burnett Heads Light, Fitzroy Island Light, itself and Archer Point Light. The light was automatic from its construction and was never manned.

Current display
The light source is a 200 Watt sealed beam array, fed from the mains electricity, with a diesel generator and batteries for backup. The intensity of the white flashes is 310,000 cd, while that of the red flashes is only 2,100 cd. This is achieved by a filter and a red plexiglas screen.

Site operation and visiting
The site and the light are operated by the Australian Maritime Safety Authority. The site is open to the public, but the tower is closed.

See also

 List of lighthouses in Australia

Notes

References

 Listed as "Point Carwright"

External links

 Grant and Tracey's Lighthouse Pages - Point Cartwright

Lighthouses completed in 1978
Lighthouses in Queensland